John Baxter (1781–1858) was an English printer and publisher.

Baxter was born at Rickhurst (Rykhurst), Alfold, Surrey, on 20 October 1781. Early in life he settled in Lewes as a bookseller and printer. Among the earliest of Baxter's enterprises was the publication of a large quarto Bible, annotated by the Rev. John Styles, D.D., and illustrated with wood engravings.

Career
This work, known as Baxter's Bible, sold well, especially in America. Baxter's other publications include several important works on the topography of Sussex, and ‘The Library of Agricultural Knowledge’ With his youngest son, W. E. Baxter, he started the Sussex Agricultural Express. He was an enthusiastic cricketer, and the joint–if not the sole–author of the first ever book of rules for that sport, the first ever published, named Lambert's Cricketer's Guide, after the celebrated professional cricketer William Lambert of that name. He died 12 November 1858. Baxter's second son, George Baxter, was the inventor of the process of printing in oil colours.

The Library of Agricultural and Horticultural Knowledge 
The Library of Agricultural and Horticultural Knowledge  had a very extensive circulation. It was published in 1830, with a second edition in 1832. George Sinclair wrote an article On the cultivation of the natural grasses for the publication. Other authors included John Ellman.

References

1781 births
1858 deaths
English printers
English publishers (people)
People from Lewes
19th-century publishers (people)
19th-century British businesspeople